AE Solar is a German TIER1 solar panels manufacturer, which was founded by Alexander Maier and his brothers in Königsbrunn, Germany, in 2003. Headquartered in Königsbrunn, the company has a presence in more than 95 countries, covering Africa, Asia-Pacific, Asia, Europe, Middle East, North America and South America. AE Solar has an annual capacity of 2,5GW by the manufacturing factories in Europe and Asia, as well, with branches in Mexico (since 2017), Brazil (since 2018) and Saudi Arabia (since 2018).

By 2019, AE Solar has three production facilities in Turkey (2021), Georgia (2019) and China (2009). Also global sales teams in Georgia, Germany, Turkey, China, Mexico, Brazil, Saudi Arabia.

AE Solar is the member of the UN Global Compact.

History 

AE Solar established as an installation company in 2003 by Alexander Maier and his brothers, Victor and Waldemar in Königsbrunn, Germany. The company launched 50 MW/year PV modules manual assembly manufacturing in 2009, China's Hongzhe with further expansion at the same location to 150 MW/year semi-automated manufacturing line installed in 2013, to 250 MW/year expansion in 2016, 525 MW/year fully automated robotic manufacturing line installed in 2017. By 2021 AE Solar operates in more than 95 countries worldwide.

Products 
AE Solar produces both polycrystalline and monocrystalline photovoltaic modules (solar panels), also the world's first Smart Shading Resistant Hot-spot Free PV module, which use bypass diodes between each cell to avoid shading consequences. AE Solar integrates NFC-Chips in its PV modules against counterfeit to protect the product authenticity.

Awards 
SNEC (2017)
Top Innovation/PV Magazine (2018)
Intersolar Finalist (2019)
Construma Award (2020), Winner for Smart Shading Resistant Hot-Spot Free Modules Technology

See also

 Renewable energy in Germany

References

Companies based in Bavaria
Electric power companies of Germany
2003 establishments in Germany
Companies established in 2003